Francisco Javier González Medina (born 31 January 1984, in Zacatecas), known as Francisco González, is a former Mexican professional footballer, who played as goalkeeper for Santos Laguna and Club León.

Notes

External links
 
 
 
 

1984 births
Living people
Mexican footballers
Club León footballers
Santos Laguna footballers
Liga MX players
Association football goalkeepers